Manguri may refer to:

Manguri, South Australia, a town in Australia
Manguri Siding, a railway station in Australia